Javier Saiz (born February 26, 1994) is an Argentine professional basketball player for Regatas Corrientes. At a height of 2.06 m (6'9") tall, he plays at both the power forward and center positions.

Professional career
In his pro career, Saiz has played in the 1st-tier level FIBA Americas League.

National team career
Saiz has been a member of the senior Argentine national team. With Argentina, he played at the 2017 FIBA AmeriCup, where he won a silver medal.

References

External links
FIBA Profile
Latinbasket.com Profile

1994 births
Living people
Argentine men's basketball players
Centers (basketball)
Power forwards (basketball)
Regatas Corrientes basketball players
Sportspeople from Córdoba, Argentina